The Battle of Azua was the first major battle of the Dominican War of Independence and was fought on the 19 March 1844, at Azua de Compostela, Azua Province. A force of some 2,200 Dominican troops, a portion of the Army of the South, led by General Pedro Santana and General Antonio Duvergé defeated an outnumbering force of 10,000 troops of the Haitian Army led by General Souffrand.

References

Conflicts in 1844
Azua
Azua
1844 in the Dominican Republic
March 1844 events
Azua